Phyllonorycter joannisi is a moth of the family Gracillariidae. It is found in most of Europe (except Ireland, the Iberian Peninsula and the Balkan Peninsula).

The wingspan is 6.5–9 mm. Adults are on wing in May and August in two generations.

The larvae feed on Norway maple (Acer platanoides), mining the leaves of their host plant. They create a fairly large and rounded mine on the underside of a leaf, between two veins but not necessarily touching both and sometimes situated at the leaf edge. The lower epidermis appears smooth or has several small creases and becomes whitish. There may be several mines in a single leaf.

References

External links
 Lepiforum.de
 "Phyllonorycter joannisi (Le Marchand, 1936)". Fauna Europaea. Retrieved 2 October 2019.
 

joannisi
Moths described in 1936
Moths of Europe